Owsei Temkin (October 6, 1902 – July 18, 2002) was William H. Welch Professor Emeritus of the History of Medicine at Johns Hopkins University. He was a Russian-born, German-educated, American medical historian.

After receiving his M.D. from the University of Leipzig in 1927, he moved to the United States in 1932 and became director of the Institute of the History of Medicine at Johns Hopkins in 1958. He became known as one of the world's foremost experts on the interaction of medicine and culture throughout history. During his academic career and retirement, he published hundreds of articles and a dozen books on the history of medicine. His last book was published in the year of his death at age 99.

Temkin received the Welch Medal and the Sarton Prize and was elected to the American Philosophical Society, the National Academy of Sciences, and the American Academy of Arts and Sciences.

Biography

Early life
Owsei Temkin was  born  in  Minsk,  Belarus (then  part  of  Russia),  on  October 6, 1902,  the  son  of  Samuel  and  Anna(Raskin) Temkin. In 1905 his Jewish family moved to Leipzig, Germany,  to  avoid  pogroms.  There  he  had  his  elementary schooling and attended the Real-Gymnasium. After the Russian  revolution  of  1917,  his  family  lost  its  Russian  citizenship.

Selected publications
The Falling Sickness: A History of Epilepsy from the Greeks to the Beginnings of Modern Neurology. Baltimore, MD: Johns Hopkins University Press; 1945, Revised 1971)
Galenism: Rise and Decline of a Medical Philosophy Ithaca, NY: Cornell University Press, 1973)
The Double Face of Janus and Other Essays in the History of Medicine Baltimore, MD: Johns Hopkins University Press, 1977)
"On Second Thought" and Other Essays in the History of Medicine and Science. Baltimore, MD: Johns Hopkins University Press, 2002.
Respect for Life in Medicine, Philosophy, and the Law. Baltimore, MD: Johns Hopkins University Press, 1977 (co-author).
Hippocrates in a World of Pagans and Christians. Baltimore, MD: Johns Hopkins University Press, 1991.
Antimalarial Drugs. Washington, DC: National Research Council, Office of Medical Information, 1944 (co-author).
Soranus' Gynecology. Baltimore, MD: Johns Hopkins University Press, 1991.
Ancient Medicine: Selected Papers of Ludwig Edelstein. Baltimore, MD: Johns Hopkins University Press, 1967 (co-editor).
In Memory of Henry E. Sigerist. Baltimore, MD: Johns Hopkins University Press, 1957.
"Metaphors of Human Biology". In: Science and Civilization, 1949, pp. 169–194.
"Science and Society in the Age of Copernicus". In: The Nature of Scientific Discovery, 1975, pp. 106–133.
A Report on the Medical Treatment of Filariasis Bancroft. Washington, DC: National Research Council, Division of Medical Sciences, 1945.
Galen's Dissection of the Liver and the Muscles Moving the Forearm. Baltimore, MD: Johns Hopkins University Press, 1946 (co-author).
"The Philosophical Background of Magendie's Physiology". Bulletin of the History of Medicine, 1946, v. 20.
Was Servetus Influenced by Ibn an-Nafis? Baltimore, MD: Johns Hopkins University Press, 1940.
The Classical Roots of Glisson's Doctrine of Irritation. Baltimore, MD: Johns Hopkins University Press, 1964.
"Materialism in French and German Physiology of the Early Nineteenth Century". Bulletin of the History of Medicine, 1946, v. 20.
"Byzantine Medicine: Tradition and Empiricism". Dumbarton Oaks Papers, no. 16, pp. 95–115.

References 

 Nutton, Vivian. "Obituary: Owsei Temkin, 1902–2002", Medical History 47(1), January 2003; pp 100–103 (accessed via PubMed Central, National Institute of Health, 13 August 2007).

See also
Fielding H. Garrison
Stevenson, L.G. and Multhan, R.P. Medicine, Science, and Culture: Essays in Honor of Oswei Temkin. Baltimore, MD: Johns Hopkins University Press, 1968.
Stevenson, L.G. and Campbell, J.A. Leaders in American Medicine - Owsei Temkin, M.D. DVD video. Atlanta, GA: National Medical Audiovisual Center, 1979.*Owsei Temkin at Eighty. Bulletin of the History of Medicine, 1982, vol. 56.
Owsei Temkin at Eighty. Bulletin of the History of Medicine, 1982, v. 56.

1902 births
2002 deaths
American medical historians
Physicians from Leipzig
Johns Hopkins University faculty
20th-century American historians
American male non-fiction writers
Members of the United States National Academy of Sciences
Fellows of the American Academy of Arts and Sciences
20th-century American male writers
German emigrants to the United States
Members of the American Philosophical Society